Alleghany Springs is an unincorporated community in Montgomery County, Virginia, United States.

Alleghany Springs contained a post office from 1854 until the 1940s. The Alleghany Springs Springhouse and William Barnett House are listed on the National Register of Historic Places.

References

Unincorporated communities in Montgomery County, Virginia
Unincorporated communities in Virginia